Williams & Everett (est.1855) in Boston, Massachusetts, was an art dealership run by Henry Dudley Williams and William Everett. The firm sold original artworks by American and European artists, as well as "photographs and carbon-pictures of eminent persons, noted places, and famous paintings." It also continued the mirror and picture frame business that had been established earlier by the Doggett brothers.

History

Gallery founder Dudley Williams had worked for John Doggett & Co., 1816-1855. "John Doggett retired from the firm in 1845, and his brother Samuel in 1854, and the business was reorganized, the manufacture of mirror and picture frames being continued under the name of Williams & Everett, who added the branch of paintings, etc.." 

Williams and his new business partner, William Everett, were related by marriage; Williams had married Everett's sister Isabel in 1832. Before creating a formal partnership, Williams and Everett each sold mirrors, picture frames and carpets from the same address on Washington Street.

The gallery was located at the corner of Bedford and Washington Street until 1885.  The gallery moved in 1885 from downtown to Back Bay, where it remained until the business closed around 1907. "Williams & Everett's Galleries, at No. 79 Boylston Street, were ... designed and built expressly as a repository of the Fine Arts. ... The architectural adornment of the interior is of the English Renaissance, with carved wood and heavy beams in sight. On one side is a carved chimney piece, extending to the ceiling, and near this is a grand staircase leading to a series of galleries, extending from the carved wood coigne which looks down into the store, to the balcony overlooking Park Square. The wainscoting of dark wood is surmounted with pomegranate hangings, and the ceiling is effectively decorated in plain and harmonious tints. Incandescent lights placed in the ceiling in a novel and original manner, are used throughout the store and galleries."

European artists exhibited included Rosa Bonheur and Jean-Baptiste-Camille Corot. Williams & Everett also exhibited and sold works by American artists such as:

 Henry Bacon
 Albert Bierstadt
 Bricher
 George L. Brown
 Mary Cassatt
 Frederic Edwin Church
 George Curtis
 Sophia Towne Darrah
 H. Anthony Dyer
 George Fuller
 Régis François Gignoux
 Childe Hassam
 Thomas H. Hinckley
 George Hitchcock
 George Inness
 Ernest Longfellow
 John Low
 A.S. Patterson
 Sarah S. Perkins
 John E.C. Peterson
 William Henry Powell
 W.T. Richards
 Caroline Hunt Rimmer
 Theodore Robinson
 John Rogers
 Henry Sandham
 William Sartain
 Frank Hill Smith
 Tait
 Robert W. Van Boskerck
 Elihu Vedder
 Theodore Wendel
 Moses Wight

"In the store are departments for etchings, engravings, water colors and photographs. If you desire to purchase a fine impression, a rare proof, a unique etching, a carbon reproduction of a favorite picture by one of the old masters, or a representative work of the modern schools, if you want instructive photographs of ancient sculptures or classic ruins, you are sure to find them in the ample folios of this establishment." The firm published its own pictorial reproductions of selected artworks, such as a chromolithograph of the character "Dotty Dimple" (after Elizabeth Murray), and photographic portraits of H.W. Longfellow and his family. "Williams & Everett, recognizing the deficiency in the subjects of photographs brought to America, have made this particular branch a specialty. ... One portion of their establishment is entirely devoted to this class of art, and here on the walls are hung large and magnificent carbons of the rarest subjects. Below these pictures of Michael Angelo, frescoes from the Sistine Chapel, his sculptures from the church of San Lorenzo, and the old frescoes of Fra Angelico and Giotto in the convent of San Marco at Florence, are ranged in large wooden cases separately the works of the famous artists, some thousand in number. Here is a whole section devoted to Bellini, another to Cimabue, and another to Velasquez. Their pictures from Spain, Italy, and Germany, France and England, are collected here, and, sitting at the table at which visitors are freely allowed to examine these treasures, a feeling of embarras de richesse comes over one."

Clients included Thomas Thompson. Among the many walk-in visitors to the gallery was Sophia Peabody Hawthorne in 1863: "5 June, Thursday. Finest day - cool. We went out after breakfast with Annie. We visited Studio gallery. ... Then to Williams & Everett's - Then we shopped." "29 September, Monday. I went to town at noon. Went to see Tilton's pictures at Williams & Everetts."

The firm consisted of its founders, Henry Dudley Williams (1809-1888) his brother-in-law William Everett (1821-1899), and their sons, Henry Dudley Williams (1833-1907) and William B. Everett (1856-1907)

In 1901, "Williams & Everett ... made an assignment. The liabilities are said to be between $40,000 and $50,000, and the assets consist principally if a large stock of prints, engravings and paintings of high quality. The firm, since the death of Mr. Everett several years ago, has consisted of Henry D. Williams. It is the hope of the firm and assignee that the affairs can be arranged without interruption of business and in such a manner as to re-establish the business on a firm foundation." The firm seems to have ceased with the death of H.D. Williams in 1907.

References

Further reading
 Copley's picture of King Charles the First demanding in the House of Commons the five impeached members, A.D. MDCXLI-II: now exhibiting at the rooms of Williams and Everett, 254 Washington Street, Boston, for the benefit of the city public library. Boston: W. White, printer, 1859. Google books
 Catalogue of oil paintings and water colors by the late John Rollin Tilton ... of Rome: on exhibition and sale from January 23 to February 2, 1889, in Williams & Everett's gallery. Google books
 King's hand-book of Boston. Boston: M. King, 1889; p. 350+. Google books

External links

 Library of Congress. "On exhibition at Williams & Everett's, No. 234 Washington Street, Boston, the original painting of Florinde, by Winterhalter, (exhibited in the Royal Academy of arts, 1852.) Admission 25 cents."
 Indiana State Museum. "Engraving of a beardless Abraham Lincoln. ... A ring of dried flowers and plants encircles the portrait. .... The label reads: '486. From Williams & Everett, (Successors to John Doggett & Co. and N.D. Cotton) ... Boston.'"

1855 establishments in Massachusetts
Cultural history of Boston
Defunct art museums and galleries in Boston
Financial District, Boston
Back Bay, Boston
19th century in Boston
Economic history of Boston